X Anniversarium is the seventh studio album by the Spanish band Estopa. It was released in 2009, marking the band's ten-year anniversary. Additionally a comic of the band was released called Ultimate Estopa, as well as a poster of the band and a flag of their first concert as a gift. The album received a Latin Grammy nomination for Best Pop Album by a Duo or Group with Vocals

Track listing

CD 1

CD 2

DVD 
The first DVD contains 24 video clips of the band, including live performances.

The second DVD called Regreso a la española is a documentary of the band narrated by their friends the band member José and David, and was directed by Andreu Buenafuente. The DVD also contains their first live performance (December 2, 2000) on the Palacio de Deportes de la Comunidad de Madrid.

Certification

References

External links
Official site

2009 albums
Estopa albums